Patricia Mukhim is an Indian social activist, writer, journalist and the editor of Shillong Times, known for her social activism. A recipient of honours such as Chameli Devi Jain award, ONE India award, Federation of Indian Chambers of Commerce and Industry FLO award, Upendra Nath Brahma Soldier of Humanity award, Siva Prasad Barooah National award and North East Excellence award, she was honored by the Government of India, in 2000, with the fourth highest Indian civilian award of Padma Shri.

Biography

Patricia Mukhim was born in Shillong, the capital city of the Northeast Indian state of Meghalaya. She is known to have had a difficult childhood as her parents divorced when she was young and was brought up by her single mother. She did her schooling and college education in Shillong and secured graduate degrees in Arts (BA) and education (BEd). She started her career as a teacher but turned to journalism in 1987 as a columnist and, since 2008, is the editor of the Shillong Times, the first English-language daily in Meghalaya. She also contributes articles to other publications such as The Statesman, The Telegraph, Eastern Panorama and The North East Times.

Patricia Mukhim is the founder of Shillong, We Care a non governmental organization which was involved in the fight against militancy in Meghalaya. She was a member of the National Security Advisory Board of the Government of India and served as a member of the National Foundation for Communal Harmony, under the Ministry of Home Affairs, India. She is former member of the Governors of the Indian Institute of Mass Communication.

Mukhim was former member District Consumer Protection Forum, East Khasi Hills District, Meghalaya. Mukhim is former member, National Security Advisory Board (NSAB). 

Mukhim is credited with several articles on the socio-political milieu of Meghalaya. She has contributed a chapter to book on matriarchy by Heide Göttner-Abendroth under the title, Khasi matrilineal society - Challenges in the 21st century and is working on a book, When Hens Crow. She has attended many conferences and seminars in places such as Japan, Thailand, Hawaii, Switzerland,UK, USA, Canada. She has also appeared on several television and radio programs.

Patricia Mukhim is a divorcee and has three children, two of her children having died earlier.

Awards and recognition
Patricia Mukhim received the Chameli Devi Jain Award in 1996 from the Media Foundation, New Delhi. The Federation of Indian Chambers of Commerce and Industry (FICCI) conferred on her their FLO award for excellence in journalism in 2008. A few months later, in 2008, she received the Upendra Nath Brahma Soldier of Humanity award. The next year, in 2009, she received the Siva Prasad Barooah National Award. One year later, the Government of India included her in the Republic Day honours list for the civilian award of Padma Shri. In 2011, she was selected for the Northeast Excellence Award. She received the O.N.E. India award in 2014. In 1995, she was honoured with the Chameli Devi Jain Award for Outstanding Women Mediaperson.

See also

 Shillong Times
 National Security Council (India)

References

Further reading
 
 
 
 
 
 

Indian women journalists
Social workers
Women writers from Meghalaya
Khasi people
Living people
Journalists from Meghalaya
People from Shillong
Recipients of the Padma Shri in social work
Year of birth missing (living people)
20th-century Indian journalists
20th-century Indian women writers
20th-century Indian educational theorists
21st-century Indian women writers
21st-century Indian educational theorists
21st-century Indian journalists
Indian editors
Indian newspaper journalists
Social workers from Meghalaya
Women educators from Meghalaya
Educators from Meghalaya
20th-century women educators
21st-century women educators